Crescent Creek is a  tributary of the Little Deschutes River in Klamath County in the U.S. state of Oregon. Beginning at Crescent Lake on the eastern flank of the Cascade Range, the river flows generally east through parts of Deschutes National Forest to meet the Little Deschutes between Crescent and La Pine.

A  stretch of Crescent Creek was named part of the National Wild and Scenic Rivers System in 1988. Designated "recreational", the segment below Crescent Lake flows through a narrow canyon and a forest of old-growth pine. One of Crescent Creek's tributaries, Big Marsh Creek, is also part of the wild rivers system. The upper  of the Little Deschutes is part of the system too.

The creek supports native rainbow trout, non-native brown trout and brook trout, and other species. The healthy and remote riparian zone along the upper creek supports a diversity of grasses, sedges, willows, and many species of birds, mammals, and amphibians.

Open from mid-May through September, it is relatively remote and quiet, with opportunities for bird-watching and fishing.

The flow of Crescent Creek is regulated by storage and releases of water for irrigation from Crescent Lake.

See also
 List of National Wild and Scenic Rivers
 List of rivers of Oregon

References

Rivers of Klamath County, Oregon
Rivers of Oregon
Wild and Scenic Rivers of the United States